Earthly Possessions may refer to:

 Earthly Possessions (novel), a 1977 novel by Anne Tyler
 Earthly Possessions (film), a 1999 film, adapted from the novel